The Centro Galego de Artes da Imaxe is a film archive in A Coruña, Spain.

See also 
 List of film archives

External links 
 http://www.cgai.org/

Film archives in Spain
A Coruña
Tourist attractions in Galicia (Spain)